The 2007–08 season of the Segona Divisió, the second level football competition in Andorra, was held from Autumn 2007 until Spring 2008.

Overview 

This season Andorra added an extra team to the Segona Divisió: (Inter Club d'Escaldes reserve team).

Teams 

The following 9 clubs comprise the Segona Divisió in 2007-08:

Final standings 

As of games played May 19, 2008

Segona Divisió seasons
Andorra
2007–08 in Andorran football